Flazasulfuron is an organic compound that is used as a herbicide.  It is classified as a sulfonylurea, because it contains that functional group. The mode of action of flazasulfuron is the inhibition of the enzyme acetolactate synthase (ALS), which results in the inhibition of amino acid synthesis, cell division and ultimately plant growth. Flazasulfuron can be used on both pre-emergent weeds and post-emergent weeds. Growth ceases within hours of the application of the compound. Symptoms include leaf discolouration, desiccation, necrosis and ultimately plant death within 20 – 25 days of application.   It is a white, water-soluble solid.

References

Sulfonylureas
Sulfonylurea herbicides